Josephine Gill (née Figlo; April 9, 1923 – August 26, 2011) was an All-American Girls Professional Baseball League ballplayer. Listed at 5' 3", 140 lb., she batted and threw right handed.

Born in Milltown, New Jersey, Josephine Figlo was a light-hitting outfielder for two teams in the early years of the All-American League. She entered the league in 1944 with the Racine Belles and then was traded to the Milwaukee Chicks during the midseason.

In a 15-game career, Figlo posted a batting average of .059 (2-for-34) with a double and four stolen bases, driving in three runs while scoring seven times. In the outfield, she recorded 11 putouts and committed four errors in 15 chances for a .733 fielding average.

In 1988 was inaugurated a permanent display at the Baseball Hall of Fame and Museum at Cooperstown, New York, that honors those who were part of the All-American Girls Professional Baseball League. Josephine Figlo, along with the rest of the girls and the league staff, is included at the display/exhibit.

Career statistics
Batting

Fielding

References

1923 births
2011 deaths
All-American Girls Professional Baseball League players
Racine Belles (1943–1950) players
Milwaukee Chicks players
Baseball players from New Jersey
People from Milltown, New Jersey
21st-century American women